I'll be back is a catchphrase commonly associated with characters played by actor Arnold Schwarzenegger.

I'll Be Back may also refer to one of several songs:
 I'll Be Back (song), a song by The Beatles
 "I'll Be Back", a 1991 song by Arnee and the Terminaters parodying Schwarzenegger and the "Terminator" character
 "I'll Be Back", a song by 2PM from the 2010 album Still 02:00PM
"I'll Be Back", a song by The Who from the 2019 album Who